Sunuka is an administrative ward in Uvinza District of Kigoma Region in Tanzania. 
In 2016 the Tanzania National Bureau of Statistics report there were 39,651 people in the ward, from 36,023 in 2012.

Villages / neighborhoods 
The ward has 5 villages and 24 hamlets.

 Kirando
 Kirando
 Msehezi
 Nyamamba
 Nyamkima
 Nyamsimbi
 Lyabusende
 Kabongo
 Lyabusende
 Mtakuja
 Karago
 Kanywangili
 Kitekati
 Kitentakuja
 Legezamwendo
 Mviga
 Mwamko
 Sunuka
 Kinyaba
 Lulinga
 Mafundikani
 Msombwezi
 Sunuka
 Songambele
 Anzerani
 Gagwe
 Gambazi
 Ilolo
 Nyandiga

References

Wards of Kigoma Region